Falkirk South is one of the nine wards used to elect members of Falkirk Council. It elects four councillors.

Following the resignation of Pat Reid, a local government by-election will be held on Thursday, 14 October 2021.

Councillors

Election Results

2022 Election
2022 Falkirk Council election

 </onlyinclude>

2017 Election
2017 Falkirk Council election

2012 Election
2012 Falkirk Council election

2007 Election
2007 Falkirk Council election

References

Wards of Falkirk
Falkirk